Maxime Moses Alexandre (1899-1976) was a French poet associated with Surrealism.

Life
Maxime Alexandre was born into a liberal Jewish family in Wolfisheim. There his first language was German, although his family moved to Lausanne during World War I. There he learnt French, and was introduced to Romain Rolland by René Schickelé.

Alexandre was active in the surrealist movement from its inception in 1924 until 1929, when he followed Louis Aragon out of the group. He contributed to both La Révolution surréaliste and Le Surréalisme au service de la révolution.  A Communist, he also worked for the French Communist Party newspaper L'Humanité. He was imprisoned when World War II started.

In 1949 Alexandre converted to Roman Catholicism, though he later left the church in reaction to what he felt was the church's anti-Semitism.

Works
 Les dessins de la liberté. 1927
 Le Corsage, 1931
 Mythologie personnelle, 1933
 Le Mal de nuit, 1935
 Sujet a l'amour, 1937
 Cassandre de Bourgogne, 1939
 Les yeux pour pleurer, 1945
 Le Juif errant, 1946
 Durst und Quelle, 1952
 La Peau et les os, 1956
 L'enfant de la terre, 1965. With illustrations by Jean Arp.
 Mémoires d'un surréaliste, 1968
 L'oiseau de papier, 1973. With illustrations by Jean Arp.
 Journal 1951–1975, 1976

References

Jean Rousselot. Dictionnaire de la poesie francaise contemporaine 1968, Auge, Guillon, Hollier -Larousse, Mooreau et Cie.-Librairie Larousse, Paris 

1899 births
1976 deaths
French poets
French surrealist writers